José Roberto Ramiz Wright, also known as José Roberto Wright or José Ramiz Wright (born September 7, 1944 in Rio de Janeiro), is a former Brazilian football referee. He supervised four matches during the 1990 FIFA World Cup in Italy.

He is also unkindly well-known by Atlético-MG fans for sending off 5 players and the club's manager during a match against Flamengo in the 1981 Copa Libertadores.

In the same year, Flamengo won Copa Libertadores, and proceeded to play the 1981 Intercontinental Cup, where they beat Liverpool F.C. by 3-0 and became World Champions.

References

External links
  Profile

Brazilian people of English descent
1944 births
Brazilian football referees
FIFA World Cup referees
1990 FIFA World Cup referees
Living people
Sportspeople from Rio de Janeiro (city)
Copa América referees